Issigeac is a small medieval village that dates back to Roman times, located in the Périgord.

A village with roots in antiquity, today it the quaint region features timbered houses circling the church and Bishop's Palace (17th century). The village is circular in plan with most buildings of medieval half-timbered style (most are original) and still retains much of its 13th-century walls. In 1438 it was pillaged by Rodrigo de Villandrando.

The village is set in the midst of wine country, and is part of the Bergerac wine-growing region.

Throughout the year, the village hosts a number of festivals and events and has a thriving market on Sunday mornings, where many gastronomic products are available as well as a selection of local wines, meats, fruit and vegetables brought directly to the market by their producers.

Population

See also
Communes of the Dordogne department

References

Communes of Dordogne